This is a list of cases reported in volume 304 of United States Reports, decided by the Supreme Court of the United States in 1938.

Justices of the Supreme Court at the time of volume 304 U.S. 

The Supreme Court is established by Article III, Section 1 of the Constitution of the United States, which says: "The judicial Power of the United States, shall be vested in one supreme Court . . .". The size of the Court is not specified; the Constitution leaves it to Congress to set the number of justices. Under the Judiciary Act of 1789 Congress originally fixed the number of justices at six (one chief justice and five associate justices). Since 1789 Congress has varied the size of the Court from six to seven, nine, ten, and back to nine justices (always including one chief justice).

When the cases in volume 304 were decided the Court comprised the following nine members:

Notable Cases in 304 U.S.

Erie Railroad Company v. Tompkins
Erie Railroad Company v. Tompkins,  304 U.S. 64 (1938), is a landmark U.S. Supreme Court decision in which the Court held that there is no general American federal common law and that U.S. federal courts must apply state law, not federal law, to lawsuits between parties from different states that do not involve federal questions. In reaching this holding, the Court overturned almost a century of federal civil procedure case law, and established the foundation of what remains the modern law of diversity jurisdiction as it applies to United States federal courts.
Although the decision is not widely known by laypeople, most American lawyers and legal scholars regard Erie as one of the most important decisions in U.S. Supreme Court history. The decision "goes to the heart" of the American system of federalism and the relationship between the U.S. federal government and the states.

Hinderlider, State Engineer v. La Plata River and Cherry Creek Ditch Company
In Hinderlider, State Engineer v. La Plata River and Cherry Creek Ditch Company,  304 U.S. 92 (1938), the Supreme Court ruled that a "general common law"  or  "general federal common law"  no longer exists in the  American legal system. Federal courts, however, retain the power to create federal common law in specific areas related to federal rights and interests (e.g., the interpretation of an interstate compact governing water rights between states.

United States v. Carolene Products Company
In United States v. Carolene Products Company, 304 U.S. 144 (1938), the Supreme Court upheld the federal government's power to prohibit filled milk from being shipped in interstate commerce. In his majority opinion for the Court, Associate Justice Harlan F. Stone wrote that economic regulations were "presumptively constitutional" under a deferential standard of review known as the "rational basis test". 
The case is most notable for Footnote Four, in which Stone wrote that the Court would exercise a stricter standard of review when a law appears on its face to violate a provision of the United States Constitution, restricts the political process in a way that could impede the repeal of an undesirable law, or discriminates against "discrete and insular" minorities. Footnote Four would influence later Supreme Court decisions, and the higher standard of review is now known as "strict scrutiny".

National Labor Relations Board v. Mackay Radio and Telegraph Company
In National Labor Relations Board v. Mackay Radio and Telegraph Company,  304 U.S. 333 (1938), the Supreme Court held that workers who strike remain employees for the purposes of the National Labor Relations Act (NLRA). The Court granted the relief sought by the National Labor Relations Board, which sought to have the workers reinstated by the employer. However, the decision is much better known today for its obiter dicta in which the Court said that an employer may hire strikebreakers and is not bound to discharge any of them if or when the strike ends. The Mackay doctrine, as the striker replacement portion of the ruling is known, is one of the most significant Supreme Court rulings in American labor law, and has defined collective bargaining in the United States since its publication. "Mackay Radio was more than a decision that provided an instrumental method for a firm to replace economic strikers and to resist their return to employment after a strike. It was also a decision that established important practices that constituted the conduct of union-management bargaining during the post-New Deal Era." The ruling is also highly controversial, even more than 80 years later. It is strongly and uniformly condemned by labor unions, and resolutely defended by employers. Among academics in the political sciences and other related disciplines, "the doctrine continues to provoke the notice and the nearly universal condemnation of scholars."

Johnson v. Zerbst
In Johnson v. Zerbst,  304 U.S. 458 (1938), the Supreme Court held that defendants have the right to be represented by an attorney unless they waive their right to counsel knowing full well the potential consequences. The case, however, only made this right applicable to federal defendants and did not extend to defendants in trials under state jurisdiction. Assistance of counsel was held to be requisite to due process of law in state felony proceedings with the Gideon v. Wainwright decision in 1963.

Federal court system 

Under the Judiciary Act of 1789 the federal court structure at the time comprised District Courts, which had general trial jurisdiction; Circuit Courts, which had mixed trial and appellate (from the US District Courts) jurisdiction; and the United States Supreme Court, which had appellate jurisdiction over the federal District and Circuit courts—and for certain issues over state courts. The Supreme Court also had limited original jurisdiction (i.e., in which cases could be filed directly with the Supreme Court without first having been heard by a lower federal or state court). There were one or more federal District Courts and/or Circuit Courts in each state, territory, or other geographical region.

The Judiciary Act of 1891 created the United States Courts of Appeals and reassigned the jurisdiction of most routine appeals from the district and circuit courts to these appellate courts. The Act created nine new courts that were originally known as the "United States Circuit Courts of Appeals." The new courts had jurisdiction over most appeals of lower court decisions. The Supreme Court could review either legal issues that a court of appeals certified or decisions of court of appeals by writ of certiorari. On January 1, 1912, the effective date of the Judicial Code of 1911, the old Circuit Courts were abolished, with their remaining trial court jurisdiction transferred to the U.S. District Courts.

List of cases in volume 304 U.S. 

[a] Cardozo took no part in the case (Justice Cardozo was seriously ill of heart disease and so missed participating in these cases; he died in July 1938.)
[b] Reed took no part in the case
[c] Black took no part in the case
[d] Stone took no part in the case
[e] Roberts took no part in the case

Notes and references

External links
  Case reports in volume 304 from Library of Congress
  Case reports in volume 304 from Court Listener
  Case reports in volume 304 from the Caselaw Access Project of Harvard Law School
  Case reports in volume 304 from Google Scholar
  Case reports in volume 304 from Justia
  Case reports in volume 304 from Open Jurist
 Website of the United States Supreme Court
 United States Courts website about the Supreme Court
 National Archives, Records of the Supreme Court of the United States
 American Bar Association, How Does the Supreme Court Work?
 The Supreme Court Historical Society